Sukiyakh is a rural locality (a selo) in Vikhlinsky Selsoviet, Kulinsky District, Republic of Dagestan, Russia. The population was 253 as of 2010. There are 2 streets.

Geography 
Sukiyakh is located 11 km northeast of Vachi (the district's administrative centre) by road. Vikhli and Tsyysha are the nearest rural localities.

Nationalities 
Laks live there.

References 

Rural localities in Kulinsky District